Werner Josef Reiterer (born 27 January 1968 in Hohenems, Vorarlberg) is an Austrian-born retired discus thrower and shot putter from Australia, who represented the latter at two consecutive Summer Olympics, starting in 1988 (Seoul, South Korea). His best result was winning the title in the men's discus throw at the 1994 Commonwealth Games in Victoria, British Columbia, Canada. Reiterer is an eight-time national champion in the discus throw.

In his book 'Positive' he admitted to five years of performance-enhancing drug use, but claimed he only used them later in his career.

Achievements
 All results concerning discus throw

References

 Werner Reiterer at Australian Athletics Historical Results

External links
 
 
 
 
 

1968 births
Living people
Sportspeople from Vorarlberg
Austrian emigrants to Australia
Australian male discus throwers
Australian male shot putters
Athletes (track and field) at the 1988 Summer Olympics
Athletes (track and field) at the 1992 Summer Olympics
Olympic athletes of Australia
Athletes (track and field) at the 1986 Commonwealth Games
Athletes (track and field) at the 1990 Commonwealth Games
Athletes (track and field) at the 1994 Commonwealth Games
Commonwealth Games gold medallists for Australia
Commonwealth Games silver medallists for Australia
Commonwealth Games bronze medallists for Australia
Commonwealth Games medallists in athletics
Australian sportspeople in doping cases
Doping cases in Australian track and field
People from Hohenems
Medallists at the 1986 Commonwealth Games
Medallists at the 1990 Commonwealth Games
Medallists at the 1994 Commonwealth Games